Mohammad Farooq Shah commonly known as Mirwaiz Moluvi Mohammad Farooq was the Mirwaiz of his time in Kashmir and chairman of the All Jammu and Kashmir Awami Action Committee, a coalition of disparate political parties in Jammu and Kashmir that sought resolution of the Kashmir conflict. He was a friend of Prem Nath Bazaz.

Shah was assassinated on 21 May 1990 by gunmen at his residence at Nageen, Srinagar. Hizbul Mujahideen militant Mohammad Ayub Dar was convicted for the murder and Supreme Court of India upheld the conviction in 2010.

See also
 Jamia Masjid, Srinagar
 All Parties Hurriyat Conference

References

1990 deaths
Kashmiri people
Assassinated Indian politicians
People murdered in Jammu and Kashmir
Kashmir separatist movement
Year of birth missing
1990 murders in India